Sharmeen Said Khan (1 April 1972 – 13 December 2018) was a Pakistani cricketer who played as a right-handed batter and right-arm medium-fast bowler. She along with her sister, Shaiza, are considered pioneers of women's cricket in Pakistan. 

Sharmeen appeared in two Test matches and 26 One Day Internationals for Pakistan between 1997 and 2002. She played domestic cricket for Lahore.

Early life 
Sharmeen Khan was born to a wealthy carpet merchant in Karachi. She with her sister were appointed full members of the Marylebone Cricket Club in 2003. She attended Concord College, Acton Burnell and University of Leeds.

Career
After studying in England and watching the 1993 World Cup final, the siblings were inspired to create their own team. They also played a match for Middlesex in 1991, against East Anglia. In 1997, they secured the right to have a Pakistani women's team, with the side playing its first matches that year, touring Australia and New Zealand before playing at the 1997 World Cup.

Sharmeen Khan died on 13 December 2018 after a struggle with pneumonia.

References

External links
 
 

1972 births
2018 deaths
Cricketers from Karachi
Pakistani women cricketers
Pakistan women Test cricketers
Pakistan women One Day International cricketers
Deaths from pneumonia in Pakistan
People educated at Concord College, Acton Burnell
Alumni of the University of Leeds
Lahore women cricketers
Infectious disease deaths in Punjab, Pakistan